The Secret of the Magic Gourd, or The Magic Gourd, is a live-action/CGI animation movie made in 2007 by Centro in co-operation with China Movie Co Ltd and Disney. It is the second film based on a 1958 novel by Zhang Tianyi after the 1963 Chinese film. The film is all about an 11-year-old lazy boy, Raymond, learns the meaning of work after a magic gourd, Bailey, grants him anything he wants.

The Secret of the Magic Gourd is Disney's first CGI/animation full-length feature film produced for the Chinese mainland market.

The film was released on January 27, 2009, on DVD in the United States. The English dubbed version of the film features Corbin Bleu as the voice of the Magic Gourd and Drake Johnston as the voice of Raymond, plus Megan Hilty as Ms. Lee. The Secret of the Magic Gourd is also available on Disney+.

Plot
When an inquisitive 11 year old discovers a mythical, magical gourd while fishing, he has no idea of the trouble that lies at the end of his hook. With the ability to grant any and every wish, The Magic Gourd attempts to make all of the boy's dreams come true, but instead succeeds in turning his world upside down.

Cast

Additional Voices
Original: Zhu Gi Long, Zheng Jia Hao, Wang Jia Kun, Lao Yi Jia, Guo Kai Min, He Qing, Meng Qing, Hu Qian, Hu Qian Lin, Long De, Zhang Yao Dong, Tang Wen Ting, Wei Ji Hao, Chen Jun Jie, Jin Li Lin, Zhou Min Min, Huang Cun Bao, Li Hao Ban, Lin Bai Ling, Pan Jia Wen, Xia Da Zi, Miao Ling, Shen Ling, Cai Sha Li, Chai Ge Fei, Wang Qing Wen, Wang Sang Qi, Sun Tian Qi, Jia Cheng, Lu Yi Han, Zhang Ruo Lin, Guan Min, Fang Li Peng, Tong Hui Lin, Zhu Yi Ting, Mo Yan Nan, Liu Jing Ni, Gu Kai Ping, Wang Hang Yang, Zhang Tian En, Yu Feng, Zhang Yan Qin, Yang Ni, Li Hao, Wang Yi, Wang Chao, Yang Yang, Zhang Yi Men, Huang Meng, Sun Bang Bang, Zhao Ren Jie
English: Corey Burton, Blake Dempsey, Tiffany Espensen, Harrison Fahn, Keith Ferguson, Isabelle Fuhrman, Cheryl Sklarr, Stephen Stanton (Father), Audrey Wasilewski

Filming
The film was shot in China in October 2005.

Reception
Following its commercial release, the film became somewhat notorious among Chinese botanist circles for its seemingly "overly realistic" depiction of gourd anatomy and physics.

External links
  
Disney's official China movie website
Disney's official USA DVD release website

The Secret of the Magic Gourd DVD Review on Kidzworld.com

References 

2007 films
2007 animated films
2007 drama films
2007 fantasy films
2000s children's fantasy films
2007 computer-animated films
Films with live action and animation
Walt Disney Pictures films
Buena Vista Home Entertainment direct-to-video films
2000s children's animated films
Films based on Chinese novels